Ralph Smith may refer to:

Ralph Smith (Canadian politician) (1858–1917), Canadian House of Commons member and Labor leader
Ralph Tyler Smith (1915–1972), US Senator from Illinois
Ralph K. Smith (born 1942), U.S. politician
Ralph Smith (American football) (born 1938), former American football player
Ralph Smith (swimmer), Australian Paralympian
Ralph Maynard Smith (1904–1964), British artist, writer and architect
Ralph C. Smith (1893–1998), United States Army general